Progress 35 was a Soviet uncrewed Progress cargo spacecraft, which was launched in March 1988 to resupply the Mir space station.

Launch
Progress 35 launched on 23 March 1988 from the Baikonur Cosmodrome in the Kazakh SSR. It used a Soyuz-U2 rocket.

Docking
Progress 35 docked with the aft port of the Kvant-1 module of Mir on 25 March 1988 at 22:21:35 UTC, and was undocked on 5 May 1988 at 01:36:03 UTC.

Decay
It remained in orbit until 5 May 1988, when it was deorbited. The deorbit burn occurred at 06:01:30 UTC and the mission ended at 06:56:19 UTC.

See also

 1988 in spaceflight
 List of Progress missions
 List of uncrewed spaceflights to Mir

References

Progress (spacecraft) missions
1988 in the Soviet Union
Spacecraft launched in 1988
Spacecraft which reentered in 1988
Spacecraft launched by Soyuz-U rockets